The Waihī River is a river of the south Canterbury region of New Zealand's South Island. It flows southeast from its sources in the Four Peaks Range, flowing through the town of Geraldine to reach the Ōpihi River close to Temuka.

See also
List of rivers of New Zealand

References

Rivers of Canterbury, New Zealand
Rivers of New Zealand